Archibald Cameron of Lochiel (1707 – 7 June 1753) was a Scottish physician and a prominent leader in the Jacobite rising of 1745. The personal physician of Prince Charles Edward Stuart, On 7 June 1753, at Tyburn, he was the last Jacobite to be executed for high treason. In popular memory, he is sometimes referred to as Doctor Archie.

Archibald Cameron is generally seen as a benevolent figure, and his execution in 1753 was controversial. His elder brother, Donald Cameron of Lochiel the "Gentle Lochiel", led Clan Cameron during the rising.

Before the uprising
Archibald Cameron was born in 1707 at Achnacarry, the sixth child (and third surviving son) of John Cameron, 1st Lord Lochiel and Lady Isobel (née Campbell).

Cameron's father, the Lord Lochiel, had participated in the failed 1715 Jacobite rising and, as a result, had become an exile, living first in Paris and then Boulogne. Archibald Cameron's elder brother was Donald Cameron of Lochiel, who was the Clan Cameron chief in the absence of their father, and is known in Jacobite history as "The Gentle Lochiel".

Archibald Cameron initially attended the University of Glasgow to study law, before transferring to study medicine at University of Edinburgh. He completed further studies at the Sorbonne in Paris and the University of Leiden in the Netherlands. He subsequently returned to the Scottish Highlands, married his Lochaber cousin, Jean Cameron, and fathered seven children.

1745 uprising 
When Charles Edward Stuart ("Bonnie Prince Charlie") first arrived in Scotland Cameron was despatched by his brother to Loch nan Uamh to communicate the futility of the enterprise and persuade the Prince to return to France. However, Prince Charles persuaded Cameron otherwise and soon the Camerons joined him in armed revolt.

Archibald Cameron first saw action in late August 1745, when he helped to lead a fairly futile attack on Ruthven Barracks. In the campaign that followed Cameron seems to have been promoted to the rank of lieutenant colonel in his brother's clan regiment. The Newgate Calendar's hagiography portrays him as being a pacifist by nature, refusing to offer more than his surgical skills in the cause, but this is likely to be inaccurate since Cameron was slightly wounded in action at the Battle of Falkirk in January 1746. He is also recorded as having performed surgery on his brother after he suffered two broken ankles and other injuries at the Battle of Culloden.

After the rising 
The defeat at Culloden ended the Jacobites' hopes, and both Cameron brothers, along with their father, became fugitives from government troops. After the burning of the family seat, Achnacarry House, the Cameron family hid at Badenoch. However, despite the danger, the Prince was determined to meet The Lochiel. Archibald Cameron was sent to Loch Arkaig to escort the Prince to the family's hiding place (3 September). The whole party then moved to Ben Alder, the seat of Ewen MacPherson of Cluny, keeper of the Loch Arkaig treasure. At Ben Alder Castle on 13 September 1746 word came that French naval ships were waiting at Loch nan Uamh, and on these the whole party escaped to France on 19 September.

Betrayal and execution 
In exile Cameron remained in Prince Charles's service, travelling with him to Madrid in 1748 and returning to Scotland privately in 1749. In 1753 he was sent back to Scotland again to obtain money from Loch Arkaig and to participate in a desperate plot to assassinate George II and other members of the British royal family. However, while he was staying secretly at Brenachyle by Loch Katrine, he was betrayed by MacDonell of Glengarry, the notorious "Pickle the spy", and members of his own clan who by this time were sickened by his Jacobitism. He was arrested and attainted of high treason under the Attainder of Earl of Kellie and Others Act 1746 (19 Geo. 2, c. 26) for his part in the 1745 uprising. He was imprisoned in Edinburgh Castle then taken to Tower Hill in London.

On 7 June 1753 Cameron was drawn on a sledge to Tyburn and hanged for 20 minutes before being cut down and beheaded. His remains were buried in the Savoy Chapel, Westminster. He was the last Jacobite to receive the death penalty. In his final papers, written from prison, he still protested his undying loyalty to the House of Stuart and his Non-juring Episcopalian principles.

Cameron was buried in the vaults of the Savoy Chapel, off the Strand in London. The Rev. John Wilkinson, who was thought to have Jacobite sympathies, was said to have paid the burial costs himself.  There was previously a stained glass window to Cameron, but this was later destroyed. A brass plaque now records the event.

Descendants
Archibald and his wife Jean Cameron had seven children. Charles Cameron (1745–1812), the noted architect in Imperial Russia was the son of Walter Cameron, a London-based carpenter who visited Archibald in the Tower of London, and was likely a relation. The fate of his children is largely unknown as Cameron records are vague on the subject, and Episcopal church records are rare. This is also probably due to the controversy surrounding Dr Archibald in the late 18th century.

In popular culture
 In 1753 John Cameron of Dochanassie composed "A Song to Doctor Cameron", an Aisling song in Gaelic in commemoration of Cameron's life.
 Cameron appears in D. K. Broster's novel The Flight of the Heron (1925), and is a leading character in its sequel The Gleam in the North (1927), which fictionalises the events leading up to his execution.

References

Sources
Profile on Am Baile website.
Kybett, Susan Maclean Bonnie Prince Charlie: A Biography, London: Unwin Hyman, 1988. . 
Mackenzie, B. W. (Lord Amulree) "Dr. Archibald Cameron", Medical History, July 1971; 15(3), pp. 230–240.
Scott, Sir Walter, Redgauntlet, 1824: relevant original documents can be seen at the Clan Cameron Archive

1707 births
1753 deaths
History of the Scottish Highlands
Scottish Jacobites
Protestant Jacobites
People from Lochaber
People executed by the Kingdom of Great Britain
Scottish people executed for treason against the United Kingdom
Jacobite military personnel of the Jacobite rising of 1745
People convicted under a bill of attainder
Executed Scottish people
Alumni of the University of Glasgow
Alumni of the University of Edinburgh
University of Paris alumni
Leiden University alumni
18th-century Scottish medical doctors
People executed by the United Kingdom by hanging
Archibald
British expatriates in France
Scottish Episcopalians